The Autozam Revue is a subcompact car that was sold by Autozam, introduced in 1990. The demise of that marque led to the cars being renamed as the Mazda Revue in some markets. The car was also sold in many export markets as the Mazda 121, where it replaced the previous 121 that had been based on the first-generation Ford Festiva.

The Revue was available in most markets as a small four-door saloon with an optional canvas sunroof added in February 1991. 1.1-, 1.3- and 1.5-litre engines were offered, with either five-speed manual or four-speed automatic transmission.

In 1996, the 121 name was shifted to export versions of the Mazda Demio, a tall, five-door hatchback, which became exported as the Mazda2 in its second generation. A Ford Fiesta, assembled at Ford's Valencia plant barely modified, but rebadged as the Mazda 121, was also sold in some markets after 1996 (where the Demio was sold at the same time with its original name). Sales of the Revue ended in Japan in June 1998.

Australia 
The Mazda 121 was often referred to as the "bubble car" or "jellybean" or "the hat" with the car's colour often added to the latter, for example: The little green jellybean.

Europe 
Sold as the Mazda 121 from 1991 until 1995, the unconventional saloon was first replaced by a badge-engineered Ford Fiesta, and shortly afterwards also by the Mazda Demio 5-door estate. Sales in Europe were low.

In Belgium and the Netherlands, it is often referred as "De Bolhoed" (The bowler hat) because of its bubble shape.

Engines 
 1991.01–1994 : 1.1 L (1,138 cc) B1, SOHC 8V, carburetor,  at 5,600 rpm,  at 3,600 rpm (Europe only)
 1990–1996 : 1.3 L (1,324 cc) B3, SOHC 8V, EGI-S,  at 5,500 rpm,  at 2,800 rpm
 1990–1998 : 1.3 L (1,324 cc) B3, SOHC 16V, EGI-S,  at 5,600 rpm,  at 3,600 rpm
 1991–1998 : 1.5 L (1,498cc) B5, SOHC 16V, EGI-S,  at 6,500 rpm,  at 4,000 rpm

References 

Revue
Subcompact cars
Front-wheel-drive vehicles
Cars introduced in 1990
Cars discontinued in 1998